National Tertiary Route 705, or just Route 705 (or ) is a National Road Route of Costa Rica, located in the Alajuela province.

Description
In Alajuela province the route covers San Ramón canton (San Ramón, Piedades Norte, Alfaro districts).

References

Highways in Costa Rica